Stephen J. Flesch (born May 23, 1967) is an American professional golfer who currently plays on the PGA Tour Champions. He was a four-time winner on the PGA Tour, and worked briefly as a TV golf analyst for Fox Sports and Golf Channel before joining the PGA Tour Champions.

Early life
Flesch was born in Cincinnati, Ohio, and attended Covington Catholic High School in Park Hills, Kentucky. After graduation, he played golf at the University of Kentucky and turned professional in 1990.

Professional career
Flesch finished in the top ten on the Asia Golf Circuit Order of Merit in 1993, 1994 and 1996. He won the 1997 NIKE Tour Championship to earn a PGA Tour card for the following season, only the second left-hander to win on what is now the Korn Ferry Tour. His first win on the PGA Tour was the 2003 HP Classic of New Orleans, but is probably best known for his come-from-behind victory at the 2004 Bank of America Colonial in Fort Worth, Texas. He has been featured in the top 50 of the Official World Golf Rankings, reaching a career high of 22nd in 2004.

Entering the 2008 Masters Tournament, Flesch was ranked number 107 in the world rankings. After three rounds, he was in third place at eight-under, three strokes behind leader and eventual champion Trevor Immelman. Playing in the penultimate pairing on breezy Sunday, Flesch posted a 78 to finish six strokes back, tied for fifth. This strong showing in a major tournament strengthened his world ranking by 28 slots, improving it to number 79.

Flesch last played a full season in 2011, then missed the cut in the 12 events he played during the 2012 season. In 2015, he finished T7 at the Barracuda Championship, his first top ten in four years.

In 2015, Flesch became an analyst for Fox Sports. He also worked as an analyst for Golf Channel before returning to competition on the PGA Tour Champions in 2017.

Professional wins (11)

PGA Tour wins (4)

PGA Tour playoff record (1–0)

Nike Tour wins (1)

Asia Golf Circuit wins (1)

Other wins (2)
1991 Kentucky Open
1993 Kentucky Open

PGA Tour Champions wins (3) 

PGA Tour Champions playoff record (1–1)

Results in major championships

CUT = missed the half-way cut
"T" = tied

Summary

Most consecutive cuts made – 11 (2004 Masters – 2008 Masters)
Longest streak of top-10s – 2 (2008 PGA – 2009 Masters)

Results in The Players Championship

CUT = missed the halfway cut
"T" indicates a tie for a place

Results in World Golf Championships

1Cancelled due to 9/11

QF, R16, R32, R64 = Round in which player lost in match play
"T" = Tied
NT = No tournament

See also
1997 Nike Tour graduates

References

External links

American male golfers
Kentucky Wildcats men's golfers
PGA Tour golfers
PGA Tour Champions golfers
Golf writers and broadcasters
Korn Ferry Tour graduates
Left-handed golfers
Golfers from Ohio
Covington Catholic High School alumni
Sportspeople from Cincinnati
1967 births
Living people